Carbon oxohalides are a group of chemical compounds that contain only carbon, oxygen and halogen atoms: fluorine, chlorine, bromine and iodine. They include carbonyl halides, COX2, and oxalyl halides, C2X2O2, where X = F, Cl, Br or I. The halogen atoms X do not have to be identical; they differ in mixed oxohalides. Most combinations of halogens exist but carbonyl iodide, COI2, is unknown. The carbon–oxygen bond length in carbonyl halides (1.13–1.17 Å) is shorter than in other carbonyl compounds such as aldehydes and ketones, carboxylic acids, esters and amides (1.20–1.21 Å). They are reactive reagents for halogenation, acylation and dehydration reactions.

See also

 Oxohalide
 Carbon compounds#Carbon halides
 Carbon compounds#Carbon-oxygen compounds
 Oxocarbon

References

Carbon oxohalides